David Victor Glass  (2 January 1911 – 23 September 1978) was an eminent English sociologist and was one of the few sociologists elected to the Royal Society. He is also one of the very few people to be elected both Fellow of the British Academy and Fellow of the Royal Society. He was professor of sociology at the London School of Economics, 1948–1978.

Life 
Glass was born in the East End of London, England, the son of a tailor, and attended a state elementary school and Raine's Grammar School. He then took a degree from the LSE in 1931.

From 1932–1940 he was a research assistant to William Beveridge and statistician, Arthur Bowley.

In 1935 he was a research assistant with Lancelot Hogben in the department of Social Biology at the LSE. At this time he came into contact with R. R. Kuczynski. After Hogben's departure and the closing of the department in 1937, he was heavily involved in founding the Population Investigation Committee (PIC).

In 1948 he became professor. and from 1961–1978 he was Martin White Professor of Sociology at the London School of Economics. Glass was succeeded in the role by Donald Gunn MacRae.

He died in 1978 from a coronary thrombosis and was survived by his wife Ruth Glass, the urban sociologist.

Positions held 
 Chairman, Population Investigation Committee
 President, British Society for Population Studies
 Honorary President, International Union for Scientific Study of Population
 Member, International Statistical Institute
 FBA, 1964
 FRS, 1971
 Foreign Honorary Member, American Academy of Arts and Sciences, 1971
 Foreign Associate, National Academy of Sciences (USA), 1973

Publications 
 The Town in a Changing World, 1935
 The Struggle for Population, 1936
 Population Policies and Movements in Europe, 1940
 (ed) Introduction to Malthus, 1953
 (ed) Social Mobility in Britain, 1954
 (with Eugene Grebenik) The Trend and Pattern of Fertility in Great Britain, 1954
 (ed) The University Teaching of Social Sciences: Demography, 1957
 Latin American Seminar on Population: Report, 1958
 Society: Approaches and Problems for Study, 1962 (co-ed)
 Differential Fertility, Ability and Educational Objectives, 1962
 (ed jtly), Population in History, 1965
 (ed jtly) Population and Social Change, 1972
 Numbering the People, 1973
 (with P. Taylor) Population and Emigration, 1976

He was an editor of the journals Population Studies and British Journal of Sociology.

See also 
 Who's Who (UK)

References 

1978 deaths
Alumni of the London School of Economics
British Jews
English statisticians
Jewish scientists
Fellows of the Royal Society
Fellows of the British Academy
Academics of the London School of Economics
British sociologists
Jewish sociologists
1911 births
Deaths from coronary thrombosis
People educated at Raine's Foundation School
Foreign associates of the National Academy of Sciences